Thomas Gawdy (by 1509 – 1556), of Shotesham and Redenhall, Norfolk, was  Serjeant-at-law, an English barrister, Recorder, and member of parliament.

Career

Family and name
There were three sons of Thomas Gawdy of Harleston, Norfolk, by three different wives, each of whom received the baptismal name of Thomas. There was the present Thomas Gawdy (d.1556), and Thomas Gawdy (d.1588), and Francis Gawdy, who was baptised Thomas but changed his name at confirmation. The subject of this article was the eldest one, by his father’s first wife Elizabeth Hellows.

Legal and parliamentary career
Apart from his distinguished legal career, Gawdy was a Member of Parliament for Salisbury in 1545, Lynn in 1547, and Norwich in October 1553.

Marriages
By 1530 he had married Anne, daughter and coheiress of John Bassingbourne of Woodhall, Hatfield, Hertsfordshire. He married secondly Elizabeth, daughter of John Harris of Radford, the widow of Walter Staynings of Honeycott, Somerset. He married thirdly by settlement dated 9 July 1554, Katherine (d.1564), the daughter of Robert Lestrange and sister of Sir Thomas Lestrange, the widow of Sir Hugh Hastings of Elsing in Norfolk.

He had several children. With his first wife Anne Bassingbourne, he had the children:

 Thomas Gawdy of Gawdy Hall in the parish of Redenhall in Norfolk, who married Honour, daughter of Walter Staynings of Honycott in county Somerset. Thomas Gawdy, Esq. bought the manor of Holebrook in Redenhall from Edward Bacon, ward of the Queen’s Majesty. Edward Bacon (b.1552) later married his daughter Catherine at Redenhall on 16 October 1569.
 Bassingbourne (d.1590), and through him he was the grandfather of Sir Bassingbourne Gawdy
 Catherine, who married Henry Everard of Lynsted in Suffolk

By his second wife Elizabeth Harris he had the son:

 Anthony Gawdy, also a member of parliament, who died unmarried, but was very close to his two nephews, the sons of Bassingbourne.

References

1500s births
1556 deaths
People from Shotesham
English MPs 1545–1547
English MPs 1547–1552
English MPs 1553 (Mary I)
People from Redenhall with Harleston
Serjeants-at-law (England)